Skibergfjellet is a mountain in Holmestrand, Vestfold, Norway. It was the highest peak in former Vestfold County with its  elevation. Views from the peak include Færder Lighthouse, Tryvannstårnet, Norefjell, and Jonsknuten.

References

Hof, Vestfold
Mountains of Vestfold og Telemark